Ned Miller, nicknamed "Buster", is an American former Negro league first baseman who played in the 1930s.

Miller made his Negro leagues debut in 1937 for the Indianapolis Athletics, and played for the Toledo Crawfords in 1939. In eight recorded career games, he posted four hits in 24 plate appearances.

References

External links
 and Seamheads

Date of birth missing
Place of birth missing
Indianapolis Athletics players
Toledo Crawfords players
Baseball first basemen